Castle Rock State Park is a  state park of California, United States, located along the crest of the Santa Cruz Mountains and almost entirely in Santa Cruz County, with parts extending into Santa Clara County and San Mateo County. It embraces coast redwood, Douglas fir, and madrone forest, most of which has been left in its wild, natural state. Steep canyons are sprinkled with unusual rock formations that are a popular rock climbing area. The park is named after a sandstone formation called Castle Rock. These trails are part of an even more extensive trail system that links the Santa Clara and San Lorenzo valleys with Castle Rock State Park, Big Basin Redwoods State Park, and the Pacific Coast. Due to its overnight parking lot, Castle Rock is a popular starting point for the Skyline-to-the-Sea Trail, a  trail that begins near by at Saratoga Gap and leads to Waddell Beach north of Santa Cruz. There are two walk-in campgrounds within the park for overnight backpacking.

Location 
The park is adjacent to Sanborn County Park (across State Route 35) and the Los Altos Rod and Gun Club Range.

Usage and activities 
Castle Rock State Park is suitable for many activities. There are two walk-in campgrounds for overnight hikers, many trails for day-hikes, rock climbing routes, and picnic areas.  Dogs are not allowed on the trails or in the campgrounds, and horses allowed only on designated trails.

History and uncertain future 
The park was established in 1968.

Under Governor Jerry Brown's 2011 budget proposal this park was going to close. This would have meant that visitors couldn't enter the park, and rangers would no longer staff the park.

California Assembly Bill 42 was signed into law on October 5, 2011. This bill allows state parks to enter into operating agreements with non-profit organizations. The Portola and Castle Rock Foundation has been formed to help support Portola and Castle Rock State Parks.

On March 14, 2012 the park was removed from the state park closure list for a one-year reprieve based on a $250,000 donation by the Sempervirens Fund.

Gallery

See also 
 List of California state parks

References

External links

 Castle Rock State Park

1968 establishments in California
Climbing areas of California
Parks in San Mateo County, California
Parks in Santa Clara County, California
Parks in Santa Cruz County, California
Parks in the San Francisco Bay Area
Protected areas established in 1968
Santa Cruz Mountains
State parks of California
Bay Area Ridge Trail